Jorge Daniel Abreu Vilela (born 16 March 1996) is a Portuguese footballer who plays for Varzim as a midfielder.

Club career
On 31 July 2016, Vilela made his professional debut with Freamunde in a 2016–17 Taça da Liga match against União Madeira.

References

External links

Stats and profile at LPFP 

1996 births
Living people
Portuguese footballers
Association football midfielders
S.C. Freamunde players
C.D. Aves players
Portimonense S.C. players
S.C. Covilhã players
Varzim S.C. players
Liga Portugal 2 players
Campeonato de Portugal (league) players